The 1904 Quebec general election was held on November 25, 1904,  to elect members of the Legislative Assembly of the Province of Quebec, Canada.  The incumbent Quebec Liberal Party, led by Simon-Napoléon Parent, was re-elected, defeating the Quebec Conservative Party, led by Edmund James Flynn.

It was Parent's final election.  Due to internal dissension within his party, he resigned in 1905, and was succeeded as Liberal leader and premier by Lomer Gouin.

Results

See also
 List of Quebec premiers
 Politics of Quebec
 Timeline of Quebec history
 List of Quebec political parties
 11th Legislative Assembly of Quebec

Further reading
 

Quebec general election
Elections in Quebec
General election
Quebec general election